The Guruvayur Temple is a Hindu temple dedicated to Guruvayurappan, a form of Krishna, located in the town of Guruvayur in Kerala, India. It is one of the most important places of worship for Hindus in Kerala and Tamil Nadu and is often referred to as Bhuloka Vaikuntha (Vaikuntha in the earthly realm).

The central icon is a four-armed standing Vishnu carrying the conch Panchajanya, the discus Sudarshana, the mace Kaumodaki, and a lotus with a tulasi garland. This image represents the form of Vishnu as revealed to Krishna's parents Vasudeva and Devaki around the time of his birth. Worship proceeds according to routines laid down by Adi Shankara and later written formally in the Tantric way, the inter-religious spiritual movement that arose in medieval India, by Chennas Narayanan Nambudiri. The Chennas Nambudiris are the hereditary tantris (high priests) of the Guruvayur Temple.

The temple is managed by Guruvayur Devaswom under the control of the Government of Kerala. The main festivals of this temple are the 10-day festival in the Malayalam month of Kumbham starting with flag hoisting on Pooyam star, Krishna Janmashtami (Birthday of Krishna) in the month of Chingam, Ekadasi (11th day) in the shukla paksha (bright fortnight) in the month of Vrischikam, popularly called as the Guruvayur Ekadasi and Vishu on the first day of the month of Medam, once a harvest festival. The temple's sub-deities are Ganapati, Ayyappan, and Bhagavati, and there are two sub-temples each, one for Ganapati and the other for ''Nagadevata'' nearby the temple. One of its replica temples is Uttara Guruvayurappan Temple located at Mayur Vihar in Delhi. The temple is dedicated to Krishna, who is worshipped as Guruvayurappan, the deity of the famous Krishna Temple in Guruvayur Town in the state of Kerala. This temple is most revered by the Malayalis and Tamilians.

All non-Hindus are prohibited entry within the Guruvayur Temple.

Legend

Guruvayur Mahatmyam – early legend

According to legend, the king Janamejaya conducted a sacrifice to destroy all the snakes of the world including Takshaka, who was the cause of his father Parikshit's death. Hundreds of thousands of snakes fell into the sacrificial fire and were killed, but the sacrifice was stopped by a Brahmin called Astika, before Takshaka was killed.

Since Janamejaya was responsible for the death of millions of snakes, he was afflicted with leprosy. He lost all hope of a cure. One day Sage Atreya (son of Atri) came before Janamejaya and told him to take refuge under the feet of Krishna at Guruvayur. Atreya told him that in the temple at Guruvayur the effulgence of Hari is at its best and Vishnu showers his blessings on all devotees. He immediately rushed there and spent the next ten months worshipping the god of Guruvayur. At the end of ten months, he returned home healthy and took the astrologer to task for making a false prediction. The astrologer told him that he would find the mark of a snakebite on his left leg. He had escaped death only because he was at that time in a temple where Ananta (the king of serpents) was present and Ananta was the brother to the deity at Guruvayur where he had finished worshipping.

The king then decided to build a full-fledged temple at Guruvayur. In time, this temple came to be downgraded and reduced to poverty during the days when Kerala was ruled by the Perumals. The Perumal rulers were mostly Shaivites and did not extend their patronage to Vaishnavite shrines. The Shiva temple at Mammiyur received their patronage and with the shift of royal patronage, the worshippers also moved to the Shiva temple. The Guruvayur temple was thus reduced to utmost poverty. However, one day, a holy man went to the Mammiyur temple for food and hospitality for the night. Though the temple was affluent, the temple authorities pretended they had nothing and scornfully directed him to the neighbouring Guruvayur temple. When the holy man entered the precincts of that temple, he was courteously received by a Brahmin boy and sumptuously fed. The holy man was very much pleased and he pronounced a blessing. According to the legend, Mammiyur Siva temple began to decline, and the fortunes of Guruvayur Vishnu temple progressed from strength to strength.

History

Pre-colonial age
In the 14th century, the Tamil literature "Kokasandesam" refers to a place named "Kuruvayur" and in the 16th century (fifty years after Narayaniyam was composed) there are also multiple references to Kuruvayur. In Old Tamil, "kuruvai" means "sea", hence the village on the Malabar Coast may be called Kuruvayur.

The earliest temple records date back to the 17th century. The earliest mention of the many important Vishnu temples of Kerala are found in the songs of Alvars, the Tamil poet-saints, whose time-line is not exactly fixed. However, by the end of 16th century, Guruvayur had become the most popular pilgrimage centre in Kerala.

Colonial age

In 1716, the Dutch raided Guruvayur. They looted treasures and set fire to the Western Gopuram (later rebuilt in 1747). In 1755, the Dutch destroyed the Trikkunavay temple and the Brahmins fled from there.

In 1766, Hyder Ali of Mysore captured Kozhikkode (Calicut) and then Guruvayur. He demanded 10,000 fanams in ransom to spare the temple. The ransom was paid but due to insecurity pilgrims receded. On the request of the Malabar Governor, Shrnivasa Rao, Hyder Ali granted a Devadaya to save the temple. Later, in 1789 CE, Tipu Sultan invaded the province. Tipu destroyed the smaller shrines and set fire to the Temple, but it was saved due to timely rain. Tipu lost to the Travancore and the English in 1792. The idol, which had been hidden underground in anticipation of the Tippu's takeover, was re-installed on 17 September 1792.

Ullanad Panikkars rescued and looked after the temple from 1825 to 1900. From 1859 to 1892, the Chuttambalam, the Vilakkumatam, the Koottambalam and Sasta shrine were renovated and roofed with copper sheeting. In 1900, the administrator Konti Menon fixed the hours of worship and led the drive to keep the temple premises clean. He set up the big bell and reconstructed Pathayappura (granary). In 1928, Kozhikode once again became the administrator of Guruvayur.

Post-colonial age

On 30 November 1970, a massive fire broke out in the temple, gutting the whole chuttambalam and the entire Vilakkumatam on the west, south and north sides.

Rudratheertham

The temple tank (pond) on the northern side of the temple is called Rudratheertham. According to legend, for thousands of years, Lord Shiva used to bath on the southern bank of this pond. Since Shiva is also known by the name 'Rudra', the pond came to be known as Rudratheertham.

Popular devotees

 Kururamma Old woman Devotee of Lord Sri Guruvayurappan is among list of prominent devotees of Guruvayoorappan. For her immense devotion in the form of Motherhood, Lord himself had decided to live with her as a foster son. She is regarded as a Re-incarnation of Mother Yashodha in Kaliyuga.
 Melpathur Narayana Bhattathiri (1560-1646/1666): A Sanskrit scholar and a devotee of Lord Guruvayurappan, known for his magnum opus Narayaneeyam.
 Poonthanam Namboothiri (1547-1640): A contemporary of Melpathur
 Vilwamangalam Swamiyar  a Brahmin saint, a contemporary of Melpathur and Poonthanam and 
 Manjula
 Chembai Vaidyanatha Bhagavathar

Dress code for entering the temple

Strict dress code exists for people who wish to enter the Guruvayur Temple. Men are to wear mundu around their waist, without any dress covering their chest. But it is allowed to cover the chest region with a small piece of cloth (veshthi). Boys are allowed to wear shorts, but they are also prohibited from wearing a shirt. Girls and women are not allowed to wear any trouser like dresses or short skirts. Women are allowed to wear sari and girls are to wear long skirt and blouses. Presently the dress code for women have been relaxed with shalwar kameez ( churidar pyjamas) being allowed.

Temple Elephants 

The Punnathur kotta, also known as the Anakotta (Elephant Yard in English), houses the 56 elephants belonging to the temple. This place is the home to the largest population of captive male Asian elephants in the world. These elephants are donated by devotees to the temple, and due to the preference of donating tusked male elephants, the ratio of male and female elephants living at the Anakotta is skewed. The elephants were initially kept at a compound close to the temple when the numbers were low. However, as more and more devotees donated elephants, the space became insufficient and hence they were moved to a larger property three kilometres away from the temple. Because of their association with the temple, devotees consider several of these elephants as living forms of Lord Guruvayurappa himself. Guruvayur Keshavan was the most famous among those. The other notable elephant was Guruvayur Padmanabhan, who was the chief of Guruvayur elephants.

The capture, treatment, and living conditions of the elephants in Guruvayur has been subject to criticism. In a study, the Animal Welfare Board of India found several violations.

See also
 Guruvayur Kesavan
 Guruvayur Padmanabhan
 Guruvayur Valiya Keshavan
 Guruvayurappan
 Punnattur Kotta
 Sabarimala
 Puttinga Temple, Paravur
 Shri Padmanabhaswami Temple
 Hindu temples of Kerala
 Sree Krishna College, Guruvayur
 Mammiyoor Temple

References

External links

Official site of Guruvayur Devasom

Krishna temples
Hindu temples in Thrissur district
Abhimana temples of Vishnu
Guruvayur